Kong-guksu or noodles in cold soybean soup is a seasonal Korean noodle dish served in a cold soy milk broth. In the Korean language, kong means soybean and guksu means noodles. It comprises noodles made with wheat flour and soup made from ground soybeans. It is unknown when Korean people started eating kongguksu; however, in accordance with the mention of the dish along with kkaeguksu (깨국수, sesame noodle soup) in Siui jeonseo, a Joseon cookbook published around the late 19th century, it is presumed to have originated at least as early as the 19th century.

See also 
 Korean cuisine
 Naengmyeon
 Kalguksu

References

External links 
 Kongguksu recipe
 Soy Milk Noodle Soup (Kongguksu) 콩국수
 [ Kongguksu recipe] at Patzzi
 Kong guksu recipe

Korean noodle dishes
Noodle soups
Soy-based foods
Cold noodles